Klub malega nogometa Oplast Kobarid, commonly referred to as KMN Oplast Kobarid, is a futsal club from Kobarid, Slovenia.

Honours
Slovenian Championship
 Winners (2): 2009–10, 2013–14

Slovenian Cup
 Winners (3): 2004–05, 2005–06, 2014–15

Slovenian Supercup
 Winners (1): 2014

References

External links
Official website 
UEFA profile

Futsal clubs established in 2002
Futsal clubs in Slovenia
2002 establishments in Slovenia